Rashidabad may refer to:

Rashidabad, East Azerbaijan
Rashidabad, Darab, Fars Province
Rashidabad, Jahrom, Fars Province
Rashidabad, Kharameh, Fars Province
Rashidabad, Kerman
Rashidabad, Kuhbanan, Kerman Province
Rashidabad, Kermanshah
Rashidabad, Kurdistan
Rashidabad, Lorestan
Rashidabad, Markazi
Rashidabad, Razavi Khorasan
Rashidabad, Tehran
 Rashidabad, Sindh, Pakistan
 Rashidabad Halt railway station